John Frederick Goddard (1795–1866) was an English chemist who made important contributions to the early development of photography, in particular in his work for Richard Beard.

Bibliography

External links
Correspondence with William Fox Talbot

1795 births
1866 deaths
19th-century British chemists
Pioneers of photography